Domenico Vincent "Vin" Dilorenzo (14 October 1911 – 18 February 1989) was an English professional rugby league footballer who played in the 1930s and 1940s, and coach/scout/trainer of the 1940s through to the 1970s, and rugby union footballer who played in the 1940s.

Background

Playing career

Championship final winners
Vincent Dilorenzo played  in Bradford Northern's 37–22 on aggregate victory over Swinton in the Championship Final during the 1939–40 season; the 21-13 first-leg victory at Station Road, Swinton on Saturday 18 May 1940, and the 16-9 second-leg victory at Odsal Stadium, Bradford on Saturday 25 May 1940.

Services rugby union
Vincent Dilorenzo played hooker in Cairo United Services' 3–28 defeat by the 6th Armoured Division (South Africa) (captained by future South Africa (Springboks) captain; Basil Kenyon) at Alamein Club, Cairo on Saturday 25 December 1943.

Club career
Vincent Dilorenzo made his début for Warrington on Saturday 19 March 1932, and he played his last match (in his second spell) for Warrington on Saturday 16 March 1940, he was transferred from Warrington to Bradford Northern, he played matches on loan from Bradford Northern to Warrington  as a guest during World War II, he played 4-matches on loan from Bradford Northern to Leeds as a guest during World War II against; Swinton at Station Road, Swinton on Saturday 22 December 1945, Hunslet F.C. at Headingley Rugby Stadium, Leeds on Tuesday 25 December 1945, Bramley at Headingley Rugby Stadium, Leeds on Saturday 29 December 1945 and Salford at The Willows, Salford on Saturday 5 January 1946, he was transferred from Bradford Northern to St. Helens, he made his début for St. Helens in the 12–7 victory over Workington Town at Knowsley Road, St. Helens on Saturday 12 October 1946, and he played his last match for St. Helens in the 8–11 defeat by Swinton at Knowsley Road, St. Helens on Saturday 26 February 1949.

Coaching career

Representative career
Vincent Dilorenzo was a trainer of Australia during the 1959–60 Kangaroo tour.

Genealogical information
Vincent Dilorenzo was the son of Michele DiLorenzo (born in Naples, Italy – death unknown) and Ada Susannah H. (née Gittins, birth registered first  1872 in Aston district – death registered second  1948 (aged 76) in Warrington district). Vincent Dilorenzo's marriage to Ida M. (née Murphy, born 10 January 1917, birth registered first  1917 in North Bierley (Bradford) district – death registered first  1979 (aged 61–62) in Warrington district) was registered during first  1937 in Bradford district. They had children; Ann Dilorenzo (birth registered fourth   in Warrington district), Michele Dilorenzo (birth registered third   in Warrington district), Terence Dilorenzo (birth registered 5 April 1947 in Warrington district – Aplastic Anemia 15 April 2012), and Kevin Dilorenzo (birth registered fourth   in Warrington district).

Note
Vincent Dilorenzo surname is misspelt as Dilerenzo on his birth registered fourth  1911 in Warrington district.

References

External links
Search for "Dilorenzo" at rugbyleagueproject.org
Search for "Dilorenzo" at espn.co.uk
 (archived by web.archive.org) Statistics at wolvesplayers.thisiswarrington.co.uk
 (archived by web.archive.org) Statistics at wolvesplayers.thisiswarrington.co.uk (martini)
Search for "Vincent Dilorenzo" at britishnewspaperarchive.co.uk

1911 births
1989 deaths
Bradford Bulls players
British Army personnel of World War II
English rugby league players
English rugby union players
Leeds Rhinos players
Place of death missing
Royal Artillery soldiers
Rugby league hookers
Rugby league players from Warrington
Rugby union hookers
Rugby union players from Warrington
St Helens R.F.C. players
Warrington Wolves players